Dancing at the Blue Iguana is a 2000 American erotic drama film, released September 14, 2000, directed by Michael Radford about the lives of strippers at a gentlemen's club. The film was based on an improvisational workshop involving the lead actors. It explores the intersecting lives of five exotic dancers who work at a San Fernando Valley strip club, the Blue Iguana, and the difficulties in their lives.

Plot
Angel (Daryl Hannah) wishes for a baby of her own or a foster child to take care of, but her messy, dysfunctional existence makes this an impossible dream. Jo (Jennifer Tilly) is pregnant, wants an abortion, and can barely contain her rage at the world, which is useful in her moonlighting as a dominatrix. Jasmine (Sandra Oh) writes beautiful poetry on the side and finally finds a boyfriend. She tells him she's a stripper, but he maintains that he is all right with it. However, once he sees her dance at the club, he disapproves silently and leaves.

Jesse (Charlotte Ayanna), the youngest and newest stripper looks for acceptance and love among the strippers and customers, but is eventually beaten by her boyfriend, leading her to drink and depression.  Stormy (Sheila Kelley) is having an incestuous relationship with her brother.

Companion documentary
In 2001, actress Daryl Hannah released a one-hour companion documentary, Strip Notes, based on her experience researching her role as a stripper in the film, which is included as an extra on the Dancing at the Blue Iguana DVD. Hannah stars along with Charlotte Ayanna, Elias Koteas, Jennifer Tilly, and Sandra Oh.

Cast
Sandra Oh as Jasmine
Charlotte Ayanna as Jessie
Kristin Bauer as Nico
W. Earl Brown as Bobby
Daryl Hannah as Angel
Chris Hogan as Dennis
Sheila Kelley as Stormy
Elias Koteas as Sully
Vladimir Mashkov as Sacha
Rodney Rowland as Charlie
Jennifer Tilly as Jo
Robert Wisdom as Eddie

External links
 
 
 

2000 films
2000s English-language films
2000s erotic drama films
Films set in the San Fernando Valley
Films directed by Michael Radford
Incest in film
American erotic drama films
Films produced by Graham Broadbent
Films produced by Ram Bergman
Films about striptease
Lionsgate films
2000 drama films
2000s American films